Ludwig Hopf (23 October 1884 in Nürnberg, Germany – 23 December 1939 in Dublin]) was a German-Jewish theoretical physicist who made contributions to mathematics, special relativity, hydrodynamics, and aerodynamics.  Early in his career he was the assistant to and a collaborator and co-author with Albert Einstein.

Biography

Hopf was born into a family of prominent hops merchants and municipal counselors in Nürnberg, Germany, the son of Elise (née Josephthal) and Hans Hopf.  From 1902-1909 he studied math and physics at the Universities of Munich and Berlin.

Hopf studied under Arnold Sommerfeld at the University of Munich, where he received his Ph.D. in 1909, on the topic of hydrodynamics.  Shortly after this, Sommerfeld introduced Hopf  to Albert Einstein at a physics conference in Salzburg.  Later that year, Einstein, needing an assistant at the University of Zurich, hired Hopf; it was an added bonus that Hopf was a talented pianist, since Einstein played the violin and liked to play duets.  Hopf was an ardent fan of psychoanalysis, had studied Freud and, once in Zurich, attached himself to Freud's ex-disciple Carl Jung.  Hopf introduced Einstein to Jung, and Einstein returned to Jung's house several times over the years.  In 1910, Hopf collaborated and published with Einstein two papers on classical statistical aspects of radiation.   Hopf’s collaboration with Sommerfeld on integral representations of Bessel Functions resulted in the publication of a paper in 1911.  Also in that year, Hopf accompanied Einstein to the Karl-Ferdinand University in Prague; however, he did not stay with Einstein long – due to “unsanitary conditions” in Prague.

In 1912, Hopf married Alice Goldschmidt, with whom he had five sons and a daughter.

During World War I, Hopf contributed to the design of military aircraft. In 1921, he accepted a position at the Rheinisch-Westfälische Technische Hochschule Aachen (RWTH Aachen University), a leading technical university in Germany, where he eventually became a professor in hydrodynamics and aerodynamics.  It was during his tenure at Aachen that he made a contribution to the Handbuch der Physik  and co-authored a “highly esteemed” book on aerodynamics.

In 1933, with the Nazis coming to power in Germany, Hopf was put on leave at Aachen due to his being a Jew, and in 1934 lost his position entirely.

Hopf remained in Germany until 1939 and escaped the Nazi regime only at the last minute. The SS was seeking to arrest him and were thwarted by his son Arnold posing as his father.  Arnold was arrested and sent to the Buchenwald concentration camp, from which he was able to escape after 3–4 weeks and emigrate to Kenya. Ludwig left Germany for Great Britain with his wife and three of his children, taking a research position at Cambridge.  He moved to Dublin in July 1939 to assume a professorship of mathematics at Trinity College.

Shortly after taking up his duties at Trinity, Hopf became seriously ill and died of thyroid failure on 21 December 1939.  At his graveside, Schrödinger called Hopf "a friend to the greatest geniuses of his time," then adding "Indeed, he was one of them."

Hopf was first cousins with mathematician Heinz Hopf and first cousins once removed with composer Franz Reizenstein.

Books
Ludwig Hopf, Introduction to the Differential Equations of Physics.  Translated by Walter Nef.  New York: Dover Publications, 1948.  (originally published by Walter de Gruyter, 1933).
Richard Fuchs and Ludwig Hopf, Aerodynamik. Nabu Press (2011). (Originally published by Richard Carl Schmidt & Co., 1922)
Ludwig Hopf, Die Relativitätstheorie. (Springer, 1931)

See also
 Einstein–Hopf Drag

Notes and sources
Notes

Sources
 Holfter, Gisela and Dickel, Horst  (2017). An Irish Sanctuary: German-Speaking Refugees in Ireland 1933-1945 De Gruyter, Oldenburg 
 Brian, Denis Einstein: A Life (Wiley, 1996) 
 Clark, Ronald W. Einstein: The Life and Times (World, 1971)
 
 
 Moore, Walter Schrödinger: Life and Thought (Cambridge, 1992) 
 Pais, Abraham ’Subtle is the Lord…’ The Science and the Life of Albert Einstein (Clarendon, 1982) 

1884 births
1939 deaths
20th-century German physicists
Scientists from Nuremberg
Academic staff of RWTH Aachen University
People dismissed from faculty positions by Nazi Germany
Jewish emigrants from Nazi Germany to the United Kingdom
Jewish physicists